Indian Gulch (formerly, Indiangulch and Santa Cruz) is an unincorporated community in Mariposa County, California. It lies at an elevation of 968 feet (295 m).

A post office operated at Indian Gulch from 1855 to 1912, with a closure during part of 1901. The place was originally called Santa Cruz from the nearby Santa Cruz Mountain 1.25 miles (2 km) to the north-northwest of the town.

References

Unincorporated communities in California
Unincorporated communities in Mariposa County, California